Achalcus is a genus of flies in the family Dolichopodidae.

Species

Achalcus bicolor Pollet, 2005
Achalcus bilineatus Pollet, 2005
Achalcus bimaculatus Pollet, 1996
Achalcus brevicornis Pollet, 2005
Achalcus britannicus Pollet, 1996
Achalcus californicus Pollet & Cumming, 1998
Achalcus cinereus (Haliday, 1851)
Achalcus costaricensis Pollet, 2005
Achalcus cyanocephalus Pollet, 2005
Achalcus dytei Pollet & Cumming, 1998
Achalcus flavicollis (Meigen, 1824)
†Achalcus latipennis Meunier, 1907
Achalcus longicercus Pollet, 2005
Achalcus maculipennis Pollet, 2005
Achalcus micromorphoides Pollet, 2005
Achalcus niger Pollet, 2005
Achalcus nigropunctatus Pollet & Brunhes, 1996
Achalcus oregonensis (Harmston & Miller, 1966)
Achalcus phragmitidis Pollet, 1996
Achalcus polleti Negrobov & Selivanova, 2010
Achalcus similis Pollet & Cumming, 1998
Achalcus thalhammeri Lichtwardt, 1913
Achalcus tibialis Pollet, 2005
Achalcus utahensis (Harmston & Miller, 1966)
Achalcus vaillanti Brunhes, 1987

Unrecognised species:
Achalcus scutellaris Van der Wulp, 1891

Nomina dubia:
Achalcus thoracicus (Philippi, 1865)

The following species were moved to the genus Australachalcus:
Achalcus albipalpus Parent, 1931: now Australachalcus albipalpus (Parent, 1931)
Achalcus brevinervis Van Duzee, 1930: now Australachalcus brevinervis (Van Duzee, 1930)
Achalcus longicornis Van Duzee, 1930: now Australachalcus longicornis (Van Duzee, 1930)
Achalcus edwardsae Van Duzee, 1930 (originally transferred to Enlinia): now Australachalcus edwardsae (Van Duzee, 1930)
Achalcus melanotrichus Mik, 1878: now Australachalcus melanotrichus (Mik, 1878)
Achalcus chaetifemoratus Parent, 1933: now Australachalcus chaetifemoratus (Parent, 1933)
Achalcus luteipes Parent, 1933: now Australachalcus luteipes (Parent, 1933)
Achalcus medius Parent, 1933: now Australachalcus medius (Parent, 1933)
Achalcus minor Parent, 1933: now Australachalcus minor (Parent, 1933)
Achalcus minusculus Parent, 1933: now Australachalcus minusculus (Parent, 1933)
Achalcus minutus Parent, 1933: now Australachalcus minutus (Parent, 1933)
Achalcus nigroscutatus Parent, 1933: now Australachalcus nigroscutatus (Parent, 1933)
Achalcus relictus Parent, 1933: now Australachalcus relictus (Parent, 1933)
Achalcus separatus Parent, 1933: now Australachalcus separatus (Parent, 1933)

Other synonyms:

Achalcus atratus Van Duzee, 1930: moved to Enlinia
Achalcus caudatus Aldrich, 1902: synonym of Micromorphus albipes (Zetterstedt, 1843)
Achalcus depuytoraci (Vaillant & Brunhes, 1980): synonym of A. cinereus (Haliday, 1851)
Achalcus pallidus (Zetterstedt, 1843): synonym of A. flavicollis (Meigen, 1824)
Achalcus pygmaeus (Zetterstedt, 1855): synonym of A. cinereus (Haliday, 1851)
Achalcus sordidus Aldrich, 1896: moved to Enlinia

The following species have been placed by some authors in this genus in error:
Achalcus calcaratus Becker, 1918: actually Eutarsus calcaratus (a synonym of [[Syntormon aulicus|Syntormon (Drymonoeca) aulicus]]) in SyntormonAchalcus pallipes Olejnichek & Bartak, 1997: actually Systenus pallipes in Systenus''

References

Dolichopodidae genera
Achalcinae
Taxa named by Hermann Loew